Énergie is a Canadian radio network of French-language mainstream rock outlets broadcasting throughout the province of Quebec and portions of eastern Ontario, in Eastern Canada. They offer a personality-driven mix of francophone and anglophone classic rock and alternative rock songs, catering to a young adult audience. Although the flagship station is CKMF-FM Montreal, the 10 stations in the network usually have their own talent and format for each of their own markets. They are owned by Bell Media.

Most "Énergie" stations broadcast in the same markets as Bell's adult contemporary network Rouge FM.

History
In December 1988, "Énergie" was created.

In 2006, Astral Media programmed a satellite radio channel, branded as Énergie2, for broadcast on Sirius Canada and Sirius Satellite Radio, on channel 89. This channel offered essentially the same format as the terrestrial network, and was hosted by Richard Fortin and Nicolas Wilson. However, the Énergie brand was entirely discarded in September 2010, as Sirius Canada acquired the channel, dropped the English artists and renamed it as Latitude Franco.

On 6 July 2009, Astral Media and European NRJ Group announced a deal to rebrand the Énergie network as NRJ, effective 24 August. (The French pronunciations of "NRJ" and "énergie" are nearly identical.) Astral retained full ownership of the stations.

For the network, the Astral Media IDs usually used Astral's rock jingles from rock stations rather than Astral's jingle packages used on the CHR stations such as CIBK-FM in Calgary or CHSU-FM in Kelowna.

On 17 August 2015, the network announced that it would rebrand itself back as Énergie, starting on 24 August.

Identity

Logos
<div align="center">

<div align="left">

Slogans
Pre-2009: Monte le son
2009–2011: Méchante radio (primary)
2009–2011: Des hits qui arrachent (secondary)
2011–2012: La radio des hits
 2012–2015 : La radio de tous les hits
 2015-2017 : Toujours en tête
 2017–present : Les + gros hits

Stations

See also
 List of radio stations in Quebec

References

External links
Official website

Bell Media
Radio stations in Quebec
Contemporary hit radio stations in Canada
Radio formats
Canadian radio networks
French-language radio in Canada